DaJuan Coleman (born October 16, 1992) is an American professional basketball player for KK Zlatorog Laško of the Slovenian League 1. He played college basketball for the Syracuse Orange.

High school career
Coleman began his high school varsity career at Jamesville-Dewitt as a freshman. His senior year in high school he was the recipient of the 2012 Mr. New York Basketball Award. Former Syracuse basketball players that won that award include Brandon Triche, Jonny Flynn and John Wallace. Coleman was on the same high school team as Triche in the '08–'09 season (Coleman's freshman year, Triche's senior year). Coleman was the number seven recruit in the nation.

College career
Coleman started the first game of his college career, a 62–49 victory over San Diego State. Head coach Jim Boeheim has put one true freshman in his starting lineup for four consecutive years. In the current season, Coleman rotates at center with sophomore Rakeem Christmas, who started at center last year and this year starts at forward, and junior Baye Moussa Keita, who started at center his freshman year. The year before that the true freshman that started was fellow former Mr. New York Basketball Brandon Triche.

Syracuse announced Coleman would have surgery on his left knee at the end of January 2013 and would be out for at least four weeks. Syracuse later announced that Coleman would miss the remainder of the 2013–14 season due to the injury.

Professional career
On July 21, 2019, Coleman signed his first professional contract with KK Zlatorog Laško of the Slovenian League 1, joining former Syracuse teammate, Kaleb Joseph.

Statistics

College statistics

Did not play during 2014–15 season (injury)
2015–16 statistics as of 2/12/16

College career highs

Points: 14 against Eastern Michigan (12/3/12)

Rebounds: 14 against Monmouth (12/8/12)

References

External links

Syracuse Orange bio
ESPN Stats

1992 births
Living people
American men's basketball players
Basketball players from Syracuse, New York
Centers (basketball)
McDonald's High School All-Americans
People from DeWitt, New York
Power forwards (basketball)
Syracuse Orange men's basketball players